Socialist Party of Lithuania was a Marxist political party in Lithuania. It was formed on March 26, 1994, The principal creators of the LSP were J.Sakalauskas, Albinas Visockas, who was to be elected leader of the newly formed party at the LSP 1st party congress, and Michailas Bugakovas. In 1997, former member of the Democratic Labour Party of Lithuania Mindaugas Stakvilevičius was elected leader and remained so until 2006 when the 7th party Congress of the LSP on October 28, 2006 elected the new leader of the party, Giedrius Petružis, who was leader until merger with the Front Party. The highest organ of the party was the Congress of the LSP. It elected the Council of the party and the management board.

Party platform 
The credo of the LSP party program was "Socialism, democracy and independence". The program of LSP was oriented towards the social state of Lithuania and what it considered in the future to be towards the new socialism. In foreign politics the party emphasized the need for a consistent policy of neutrality and good and friendly relations with all states, especially the other Baltic states and Lithuania's other neighbours. economically it supports a State regulated, socially oriented market economy - with the production forces and relations of production the managements goal. Markets in the system - as far as possible, and state regulation - as needed. It considers the principles of state regulation as the best economic development incentive.

Party ideology 
The LSP ideology was based on the methodology of dialectical materialism, the theory of Marxism and contemporary social science. It believed that Socialists should unambiguously disassociate from Stalinist and totalitarian theories and practice. LSP propagated what it believed to be the new 21st century socialism.

References

External links 
 Official web site

Communist parties in Lithuania
Political parties established in 1994
Defunct political parties in Lithuania
Socialist parties in Lithuania
1994 establishments in Lithuania
International Meeting of Communist and Workers Parties